38 and 42 Mosley Street in Manchester, England, is a double-block Victorian bank constructed between 1862 and c. 1880 for the Manchester and Salford Bank. It was occupied in 2001 by the Royal Bank of Scotland. The original block of 1862 was the "last great work"  of Edward Walters, and the extension of the 1880s was by his successors Barker and Ellis. It is a Grade II* listed building.

The bank, on the corner of Mosley Street and York Street, is constructed in the Italian palazzo style. The original block has three storeys and seven bays, and the extension has four bays. It is built in ashlar, with slate roofs.

The ground floors are rusticated with massive pilasters, and the piano nobile above has windows with substantial pediments. The roofline carries a balustrade with urns and chimneys. The interior contains a "very fine banking hall with columns and coffered ceiling". An extension of 1975 "palely follow(s) the nineteenth century rhythms.

See also

Grade II* listed buildings in Greater Manchester
Listed buildings in Manchester-M2

Notes

References

Grade II* listed buildings in Manchester
Grade II* listed banks
Office buildings in Manchester
1862 establishments in England
Edward Walters buildings